Peonage slavery can refer to:
peon (peonage)
debt slavery (also known as debt bondage or bonded labor)